Maartje Goderie (born 5 April 1984, Den Bosch) is a Dutch field hockey player, who plays as forward for Dutch club HC Den Bosch. She also plays for the Netherlands national team and she was part of the Dutch squad that became World Champion at the 2006 Women's Hockey World Cup and which won the 2007 Champions Trophy.

At the 2008 Summer Olympics in Beijing she won an Olympic gold medal with the Dutch national team beating China in the final 2–0. In the final Goderie scored the second goal. At the 2012 Summer Olympics, she won a second gold.

References

External links
 
 Dutch Hockey Federation

1984 births
Living people
Dutch female field hockey players
Field hockey players at the 2008 Summer Olympics
Field hockey players at the 2012 Summer Olympics
Medalists at the 2008 Summer Olympics
Medalists at the 2012 Summer Olympics
Olympic field hockey players of the Netherlands
Olympic gold medalists for the Netherlands
Olympic medalists in field hockey
Sportspeople from 's-Hertogenbosch
HC Den Bosch players
20th-century Dutch women
21st-century Dutch women